Cytomics is the study of cell biology (cytology) and biochemistry in cellular systems at the single cell level. It combines all the bioinformatic knowledge to attempt to understand the molecular architecture and functionality of the cell system (Cytome).  Much of this is achieved by using molecular and microscopic techniques that allow the various components of a cell to be visualised as they interact in vivo.

Cytome
Cytomes are the cellular systems, subsystems, and functional components of the 
body. The cytome is the collection of the complex and dynamic cellular processes (structure and function) underlying physiological processes. It describes the structural and functional heterogeneity of the cellular diversity of an organism.

Human Cytome Project
The Human Cytome Project is aimed at the study of the biological system structure and function of an organism at the cytome level.

See also 
 Flow cytometry
 Genomics
 Omics
 Proteomics
 Lipidomics
 List of omics topics in biology
 Metabolomics

References

Further reading
 Bernas T., Gregori G., Asem E. K., Robinson J. P., Integrating cytomics and proteomics, Mol Cell Proteomics. 2006 Jan;5(1):2-13.
 Herrera G., Diaz L., Martinez-Romero A., Gomes A., Villamon E., Callaghan R. C., O'connor J. E., Cytomics: A multiparametric, dynamic approach to cell research, Toxicol In Vitro. 2006 Jul 22.
 Kriete A., Cytomics in the realm of systems biology, Cytometry A. 2005 Nov;68(1):19-20.
 Murphy R. F., Cytomics and location proteomics: automated interpretation of subcellular patterns in fluorescence microscope images, Cytometry A. 2005 Sep;67(1):1-3.
 Schubert W., Cytomics in characterizing toponomes: towards the biological code of the cell, Cytometry A. 2006 Apr;69(4):209-11.
 Van Osta P., Ver Donck K., Bols L., Geysen J., Cytomics and drug discovery., Cytometry A. 2006 Mar;69(3):117-8.

Cell biology